The Buffalo News is the daily newspaper of the Buffalo–Niagara Falls metropolitan area, located in downtown Buffalo, New York. It recently sold its headquarters to Uniland Development Corp. It was for decades the only paper fully owned by Warren Buffett's Berkshire Hathaway. On January 29, 2020, the paper reported that it was being sold to Lee Enterprises.

History

The News was founded in 1873 by Edward Hubert Butler, Sr. as a Sunday paper. On October 11, 1880, it began publishing daily editions as well, and in 1914, it became an inversion of its original existence by publishing Monday to Saturday, with no publication on Sunday. During most of its life, the News was known as The Buffalo Evening News. A gentleman's agreement between the Evening News and the Buffalo Courier-Express meant that the Evening News would be evening-only, and the Courier-Express would be morning-only. Until 1977, the News did not publish on Sundays because of the agreement, and its weekend edition appeared on Saturday evening.

The Butler family owned the Evening News until 1974, when longtime owner and publisher Katherine Butler, granddaughter of the founder, died and left no heirs. The Evening News properties were placed in a blind trust, which sold the Evening News to Berkshire Hathaway in 1977. The new owners began publishing on Saturday and Sunday mornings. After a period of financial decline, the Courier-Express published its last issue on September 19, 1982. The Evening News then shortened its name to The Buffalo News and became an all-day newspaper, publishing two editions seven days a week.

On October 1, 2006, the News announced it would abandon its evening edition later that month.

The Buffalo News had published three morning editions (Western New York, Final and Niagara) that appear online at BuffaloNews.com, reaching over 400,000 readers, across eight counties each day. These separate editions were eliminated in 2018 and consolidated into a single Final edition, in response to a newsprint shortage.
The News Designated Market Area had the largest adult population in upstate New York. Counties in total circulation area: New York - Allegany, Cattaraugus, Chautauqua, Chemung, Erie, Genesee, Livingston, Monroe, Niagara, Ontario, Steuben, Wyoming; Pennsylvania - Cameron, Erie, McKean, Potter, Warren.

The newspaper founded and owned the WBEN television and radio stations, which are now WIVB (Channel 4), WBEN (930), WYRK (106.5) and WTSS (102.5), respectively. The radio stations are now owned by separate companies (WBEN and WTSS are now held by Audacy; WYRK by Townsquare Media), but in 2014, WIVB came back under partial coownership, with the News when Buffett's Media General merged with the WIVB parent company, LIN Media.

The online version of The Buffalo News operates under a soft paywall allowing a limited number of page views per week. All Buffalo Bills-related content, branded as "BN Blitz", is behind a hard paywall.

On January 29, 2020, the News reported it was being sold along with the rest of Berkshire Hathaway's newspaper portfolio to Lee Enterprises, an Iowa-based owner of 50 newspapers that has had significant ties to Berkshire Hathaway since 2012 and had operated Berkshire Hathaway's newspapers since 2018.

Pulitzer Prizes

Journalists for The Buffalo News and The Buffalo Evening News have won four Pulitzer Prizes:
 In 1958, Bruce Shanks received the Editorial Cartooning award for his August 10, 1957 piece, "The Thinker", detailing union corruption. 
 In 1961, Edgar May received the Local Reporting award for his series, "Our Costly Dilemma," concerning the need for reform of New York State's welfare system. The series touched off debates about welfare reform nationwide. 
 In 1990, Tom Toles brought the News its second Editorial Cartooning award, for his work throughout the year (although his piece "First Amendment" has been cited as the work that merited the award). (Toles currently serves as an editorial cartoonist with The Washington Post, where he succeeded the late Herbert Block, known as Herblock.) 
 In 2015, Adam Zyglis won the Pulitzer Prize for Editorial Cartooning for using, in the committee's citation, "strong images to connect with readers while conveying layers of meaning in few words". 
News journalists have been finalists for three other Pulitzer Prizes, but did not win: 
 Toles (1985 and 1996, for Editorial Cartooning) and, 
 James Heaney (1993, for Investigative Reporting).
Other journalists who won awards include Richard J. Burke, who in 1972 won the New York State Associated Press Award for his series of articles about bicycling around Western New York.

Past publishers and editors
 Edward Hubert Butler, Sr. - Publisher, 1880 - 1914: founder
 Edward Hubert Butler Jr. - Publisher, 1914 - 1956: son of Butler Sr
 James H. Righter - Publisher, 1956 - 1971
 Kate M. Robinson Butler - Publisher, 1971 - 1974: wife of Butler Jr
 Henry Z. Urban - Publisher, 1974 - 1983
 Stanford Lipsey - Publisher, 1983 - 2013
 Alfred H. Kirchhofer - Editor, 1956 - 1966
 Paul E. Neville - Editor, 1966 - 1969
 Murray B. Light - Editor, 1979 - 1999
 Margaret M. Sullivan - Editor, 1999 - 2012
 Michael K. Connelly - Editor, 2012–2022
 Warren T. Colville - Publisher, 2013–2020

Only three members of the Butler family were publishers.

References

External links
 
 
 As of September 2022, New York State Historic Newspapers  has 1881-1905 issues of the Buffalo Evening News online for free, full-text access, with more to come.
 As of October 2022,  Newspapers.com has 1881-2022 issues of the Buffalo News online on a paid subscription basis. Some public and academic libraries offer Newspapers.com to their users.

1977 mergers and acquisitions
Newspapers published in Buffalo, New York
Daily newspapers published in New York (state)
Pulitzer Prize-winning newspapers
Newspapers established in 1880
1880 establishments in New York (state)
Lee Enterprises publications